Halsted Sayer Cobden (20 November 1845 – 5 January 1909) was an English cricketer. He played four matches for Gloucestershire in 1872. His brother, Frank Cobden, also played first-class cricket.

References

1845 births
1909 deaths
English cricketers
Gloucestershire cricketers
People from Marylebone
Cricketers from Greater London